Huddersfield Town's 1991–92 campaign saw them finish 3rd, despite getting rid of Eoin Hand and replacing him with his assistant manager Ian Ross. Town missed out on promotion to Division 2, following their defeat to Peterborough United in the play-offs.

Squad at the start of the season

Review
With 3 years gone since Town's relegation from Division 2, some Town fans were beginning to wonder if Eoin Hand was going to get them promoted. Phil Starbuck was brought in from Nottingham Forest and he helped bring in the goals along with Iffy Onuora and Iwan Roberts. Town made a fairly good start to the season, with only one loss in their first 9 games. Form was intermittent with losses and wins more often than not. They were still hunting for an automatic promotion or a play-off place.

After Christmas, Town's form gradually got worse, with a run of only 2 wins in 12, which saw Eoin Hand given the sack on 6 March. His assistant Ian Ross replaced him immediately and after a win against Shrewsbury Town, Town lost 3 games in a row, but they then won 7 out of their last 8 games, which gave them 3rd place in the table, so they had a two-legged play-off match against Peterborough United.

In the first leg at London Road, Town got a very respectable 2–2 draw, which seemed to suggest that Town's chances of progressing to the final to play Stockport County. Town took an early lead at Leeds Road thanks to a goal from Phil Starbuck, but Peterborough got 2 late goals to send them through to the final at Wembley, where they beat Stockport and got promotion to the newly created Division 1. So, because of the formation of the new Premier League, Town actually did play in Division 2 the next season.

Squad at the end of the season

Results

Division Three

Division 3 play-offs

FA Cup

League Cup

League Trophy

Appearances and goals

1991–92
1991–92 Football League Third Division by team